Ejnar Sylvest (1880 – 1972) was a Danish family physician who described Bornholm disease or the "devil's grip" following an outbreak affecting 23 fisherman in Melstedgård and Gudhjem whilst on holiday on Bornholm Island, Denmark.

References 

Danish general practitioners
1880 births
1972 deaths